Operation Patrick was a security operation conducted during the Vietnam War by the U.S. 3rd Brigade, 4th Infantry Division in Bình Định Province, South Vietnam from March 1 to 30, 1968.

Background
The 1st Battalion, 50th Infantry Regiment had been patrolling Bình Định Province since September 1967, supporting South Vietnamese and South Korean units. In early March, the 3rd Brigade, 4th Infantry Division commanded by Col. Eugene Forrester was deployed to improve security in the coastal lowlands.

Operation
The attackers failed to penetrate the perimeter and 36 were killed.

On March 15, during a patrol north of Phù Mỹ, the 1/50th Infantry engaged a force from the 22nd Regiment, killing a further 34 PAVN.

Aftermath
The operation concluded on March 30, when the 3rd Brigade moved to the Central Highlands to rejoin the rest of the 4th Division. The 4th Battalion, 503rd Infantry Regiment began Operation Cochise Green continuing the mission of Operation Patrick.

References

1968 in Vietnam
Battles and operations of the Vietnam War
Battles and operations of the Vietnam War in 1968
History of Bình Định province